In mathematics, the Gauss circle problem is the problem of determining how many integer lattice points there are in a circle centered at the origin and with radius .  This number is approximated by the area of the circle, so the real problem is to accurately bound the error term describing how the number of points differs from the area.
The first progress on a solution was made by Carl Friedrich Gauss, hence its name.

The problem

1, 5, 13, 29, 49, 81, 113, 149, 197, 253, 317, 377, 441  
0, 3, 13, 28, 50, 79, 113, 154, 201, 254, 314, 380, 452

Bounds on a solution and conjecture
This is because on average, each unit square contains one lattice point. Thus, the actual number of lattice points in the circle is approximately equal to its area, . So it should be expected that

for some error term  of relatively small absolute value. Note that  does not have to be an integer. After   one has At these places  increases by  after which it decreases (at a rate of ) until the next time it increases.

Gauss managed to prove that

Hardy and, independently, Landau found a lower bound by showing that

using the little o-notation.  It is conjectured that the correct bound is

with the lower bound from Hardy and Landau in 1915, and the upper bound proved by Martin Huxley in 2000.

Exact forms

The value of  can be given by several series.  In terms of a sum involving the floor function it can be expressed as:

This is a consequence of Jacobi's two-square theorem, which follows almost immediately from the Jacobi triple product.

A much simpler sum appears if the sum of squares function  is defined as the number of ways of writing the number  as the sum of two squares. Then

Most recent progress rests on the following Identity, which has been first discovered by Hardy:

where  denotes the Bessel function of the first kind with order 1.

Generalizations

Although the original problem asks for integer lattice points in a circle, there is no reason not to consider other shapes, for example conics; indeed Dirichlet's divisor problem is the equivalent problem where the circle is replaced by the rectangular hyperbola.  Similarly one could extend the question from two dimensions to higher dimensions, and ask for integer points within a sphere or other objects. There is an extensive literature on these problems. If one ignores the geometry and merely considers the problem an algebraic one of Diophantine inequalities, then there one could increase the exponents appearing in the problem from squares to cubes, or higher.

The dot planimeter is physical device for estimating the area of shapes based on the same principle. It consists of a square grid of dots, printed on a transparent sheet; the area of a shape can be estimated as the product of the number of dots in the shape with the area of a grid square.

The primitive circle problem

Another generalization is to calculate the number of coprime integer solutions  to the inequality

This problem is known as the primitive circle problem, as it involves searching for primitive solutions to the original circle problem. It can be intuitively understood as the question of how many trees within a distance of r are visible in the Euclid's orchard, standing in the origin.
0, 4, 8, 16, 32, 48, 72, 88, 120, 152, 192 … .

As with the usual circle problem, the problematic part of the primitive circle problem is reducing the exponent in the error term. At present, the best known exponent is  if one assumes the Riemann hypothesis. Without assuming the Riemann hypothesis, the best known upper bound is

for a positive constant . In particular, no bound on the error term of the form  for any  is currently known that does not assume the Riemann Hypothesis.

Notes

External links

Arithmetic functions
Lattice points
Unsolved problems in mathematics